La vie devant nous was the most popular teenage drama in France about a group of high school friends growing up, falling in love, fighting, dealing with troubles, exploring their sexuality and more.

Cast
Gianni Giardinelli : Stanislas de Courbel
Marie Mouté : Alizé Guillaume
Louise Monot : Marine Lavor
Samuel Perche : Constant de Courbel
Camille De Pazzis : Ines Guérin
Guillaume Delorme : Barthélémy Berger
Caroline Berg : Mme Lavalette
Stéphane Boucher : M. Moreau
Chad Chenouga : M. Salmi
Edgar Givry : M. Antoine de Courbel
Xavier Lafitte : Gaël Venturi
Micaelle Mee-Sook : Mère de Jade
Anne-Marie Pisani : La voyante
Myriam Roussel : Mme Marie Berger
Alice Taglioni : Irène
Élodie Yung : Jade Perrin
Delphine Chanéac : Pauline
Marine Danaux : Adèle
Sophie Michaud : Mme de Courbel
Xavier Laurent: Mathias Granier
Daniel Russo: Daniel
Julie de Bona: Éloïse
Nadège Beausson-Diagne

Crew
Creator : Vincenzo Marano
Executive Producer:  Hugues Nonn
Production: Adélaïde Productions

Episodes
 Les rebelles
 Marine
 Stan baby-sitter
 Harcèlement
 L'adoption
 Le producteur
 Comme un grand
 Poudre aux yeux 
 Bac blanc
 Confusions
 Le retour
 Voyance
 Meilleurs vœux
 Le film
 Concours de circonstances
 Saint-Valentin
 Le fait accompli
 Place blanche
 Le Bulletin
 Liaison interdite
 Un jeu cruel
 Partir, revenir
 Usurpation d'identité
 La maladie de Barthe
 Rien ne sert de courir
 Vérité ou mensonge
 Sous location
 Pour le meilleur et pour le pire
 Arrestation
 La vie continue
 Tout un roman
 La journée de la femme
 Dérapage
 Révolte
 Machination
 Révisions
 Une semaine mouvementée
 L'épreuve de français
 Rentrée
 Échec et mat
 Duelles
 Le mal par le mal
 Crise d'identité
 Au pied du mur
 Censure
 Un homme de cœur
 L'arnaque
 Tel père, tel fils
 Star système
 Ma mère
 Trahison
 Les lauréats

External links 
 

2000s TV shows in France
2000s French drama television series
2002 French television series debuts
2000s teen drama television series
Television series about teenagers